Ilias Poursanidis (born 13 April 1972) is a Greek former professional footballer who played as a defensive midfielder.

Poursanidis began his career with Athens-based club Chaidari F.C. His quality as a defensive midfielder made him a hot prospect across Greece, and he was eventually signed by Greek first division club OFI Crete. At only 20, Poursanidis soon became a first team regular for the Cretan club, making over 100 appearances in the black and white shirt until he was eventually picked up by Greek champions Olympiacos.

It would be with the red and whites where Poursanidis would experience the peak of his career. A key part in their long running Championship winning squad, Poursanidis won 6 championships as well as 1 Greek Cup. Also experiencing UEFA Champions League football, Poursanidis became a fan favourite in Piraeus for his determination and love for the badge which he showed in over 100 appearances spanning 6 years at the club.

Eventually making way for the younger Brazilian superstar Ze Elias, Poursanidis finished his career with a five-year spell at Iraklis FC. His final match took place on Sunday, 20 April 2008 against his former club Olympiacos at Karaiskaki Stadium. Subbed off near the end of the second half, Poursanidis left the field in tears as over 30,000 Olympiacos fans chanted his name along with a standing ovation.

Poursanidis earned his first call up to the Greece national team during his time at OFI Crete. He would eventually earn himself 22 caps, and become a key part of the UEFA Euro 2000 qualifying squad that barely missed out on the final tournament.

Honours
 Greek Championship: 1997–1998, 1998–1999, 1999–2000, 2000–2001, 2001–2002, 2002–2003
 Greek Cup: 1998–1999

References

External links

1972 births
Living people
Association football midfielders
Greece international footballers
Super League Greece players
Olympiacos F.C. players
OFI Crete F.C. players
Iraklis Thessaloniki F.C. players
Footballers from Athens
Greek footballers